Parton is a village and civil parish on the Cumbrian coast, overlooking the Solway Firth, 1¼ miles (2 km) of Whitehaven in England. The parish had a population of 924 in 2001, decreasing to 914 at the 2011 Census. Formerly a port and a mining centre located on the A595 trunk road and the Cumbrian Coast railway line.

History

Beginnings
The sheltered anchorage in Parton Bay was used by the Romans, who had a fort on the high ground to the north of the present village, beneath St Bridget's Church. The platform of the fort can still be seen today. Later, the bay was used by the inhabitants of Low Moresby, the hamlet which grew up to the east of the old fort in the Middle Ages. In Elizabethan times a number of small merchant vessels were based in the bay, trading as far as Chester; by this time there was probably also a salt-pan in operation. The port was developed in the early 17th century to cater for Moresby's coal trade, but fell into decline after two generations of the Lowther family turned the hamlet of Whitehaven into a major port. Although the Lowthers theoretically had the legal power to prevent port development at Parton, entrepreneur Thomas Lamplugh teamed up with Henry Fletcher, lord of the manor of Moresby, to "repair" the harbour at Parton, following which Fletcher sold off plots for development along the shore. Within about five years (boosted by Lamplugh's private Act of Parliament in 1705 to break the Lowthers' legal power) a new port community had developed, mainly serving local collieries, but also including industrial facilities such as a glassworks – which was able to export bottles as far as London thanks to the improved harbour.

18th century prosperity
Unfortunately, Parton Bay is not as well sheltered as Whitehaven, and within about 15 years, Lamplugh was unable to afford maintenance costs (possibly a contributory factor to the closure of the glassworks and salt-pan about this time). The manor of Moresby was bought in 1722 by one Thomas Brougham, who was able to sideline Lamplugh and develop the port himself, but ironically, in 1738, he sold his rights to the Lowther family. Surprisingly, rather than shut down the port which rivalled Whitehaven, they used it themselves for some of their coal shipments, and Parton prospered for decades. New industries developed, most notably a brewery, but everything was nearly wrecked in 1795, when a storm destroyed the harbour breakwaters. With such extensive damage, the harbour reverted to being a little fishing haven, but the village industries had enough local custom to survive, for a while at least.

Surprisingly, a new and important industrial concern opened to the north of the village in 1800, the Lowca engineering company. In 1817, the large tannery at the south end of the village was bought for development as a colliery; the coal being mined some distance inland and brought to Parton along a tunnel called the Parton Drift, which also drained the mine workings. To convey coal to the port of Whitehaven a horse-drawn tramway was built along the foot of the cliffs.

19th century onward
In 1840 the Lowca engineering works of Tulk and Ley made the first locomotive for the new Maryport and Carlisle Railway, but ironically, it had to be transported from Parton by seagoing barge. Not until several years later was the technically challenging railway extension to Whitehaven via Parton developed. The railway soon supplanted the old tramway, and brought new opportunities for Parton's industries. The colliery, the engineering works and the brewery all thrived, an iron-foundry opened next to the new railway station, and in the 1870s an ironworks was established on the shore near the Lowca works. Unfortunately, the end of the 19th century was a period of industrial consolidation, and Parton's relatively small businesses began to struggle.

By the 1920s, almost all were gone, and Parton became a dormitory town for collieries around Lowca and Whitehaven. Many of the houses in the old village were over 200 years old by this time, and were classified as slums, so over the next half-century new housing estates were developed on top of the Brows- the escarpment overlooking the old port. Although the local collieries have all closed, Parton's dormitory function continues, thanks to its good transport access. Moresby Hall and parish church remain, just outside the village boundary, on the high ground to the north of Parton.

Governance
Parton is within the Copeland UK Parliamentary constituency,  Trudy Harrison is the Member of parliament.

Before Brexit, its residents were covered by the North West England European Parliamentary Constituency.

For Local Government purposes it is in the Distington ward of the Borough of Copeland and the Howgate ward of Cumbria County Council.

The village also has its own Parish Council; Parton Parish Council,

Gallery

See also

Listed buildings in Parton, Cumbria

References

Further reading
Bradbury, D. "Parton Part One: Story of a Cumbrian Village from Its Beginnings to 1930 Pt. 1 (History of Parton)", 
Bradbury, D. "Parton Part Off: The Reshaping of a Cumbrian Village from the 1920s to the 1970s",

External links
 Cumbria County History Trust: Parton (nb: provisional research only – see Talk page)

Villages in Cumbria
Populated coastal places in Cumbria
Civil parishes in Cumbria
Borough of Copeland